Oog & Blik was an Amsterdam-based Dutch publisher of comics founded by Joost Swarte and Hansje Joustra in 1985.

Oog & Blik offered books mostly for an adult audience. It published original and translated graphic novels, underground comix, autobiographical comics, picture books, and silkscreens by Joost Swarte. Around 2010 De Bezige Bij bought Oog & Blik. Joustra was fired in 2014 and started a new publishing company called Scratch Books. Almost all comic books artists left Oog & Blik afterwards to join Joustra's new company. Bezige Bij quit publishing comics in 2015 and further activities as Oog & Blik were put on hold.

The story of Oog & Blik was used as a case-study about creating and sustaining artistic independence.

Creators
Oog & Blik books include those by:

Zeina Abirached
Stanislas Barthélémy
Charles Berberian
Enki Bilal
Christophe Blain
Theo van den Boogaard
François Boucq
Daniel Clowes
Robert Crumb
Def P
Guy Delisle
Peter van Dongen
Guido van Driel
Philippe Dupuy
Maaike Hartjes
Marcel Ruijters
Mark Hendriks
Ben Katchor
Hanco Kolk
Erik Kriek
Jacques de Loustal
Moebius
Peter Pontiac
Michel Rabagliati
Art Spiegelman
Joost Swarte
Jacques Tardi
Lewis Trondheim
Judith Vanistendael
Windig & de Jong
Peter de Wit
Typex

References 

1985 establishments in the Netherlands
Book publishing companies of the Netherlands
Dutch comics
Mass media in Amsterdam
Defunct publishing companies of the Netherlands